Artur Antoni Dmochowski (born 13 June 1959 in Kraków) is a Polish journalist, historian, and diplomat; ambassador to Montenegro (since 2018).

Life 

Dmochowski had started, in 1978, his studies at the AGH University of Science and Technology, Kraków. In 1986, he graduated from history at the Jagiellonian University. He has been educated also at the University of Maryland (postgraduate studies in foreign policy) and, thanks to Fulbright grant, in 1995, he gained MA from the Middlebury Institute of International Studies at Monterey, California.

In 1980, he was spokesman of the Founding Committee of the AGH Independent Students’ Association. Between 1984 and 1985, he was presiding the Student Self-Government and was member of the Senate of the Jagiellonian University. During the whole 1980s he was active in the underground publishing movement; being founder and editor-in-chief of the Od Nowa and Czas Solidarności magazines. He has been arrested and detained several times.

After the collapse of communism in 1989, he continued his work as an editor and journalist for, among others, Nowy Dziennik in New York, TVP3 Kraków, and Gazeta Polska. In 1993, he started his career at the Ministry of Foreign Affairs. He was representing Poland at the CSCE Peace Mission in Georgia (1994) and the OSCE Mission in Bosnia and Herzegovina (1996), among others. From 2000 to 2006 he was serving as a minister-counsellor at the Embassy in Rome. Since 2006, he was journalist again, founding and directing the TVP Historia channel. Since 2011, Dmochowski has been editor of Gazeta Polska and Gazeta Polska Codziennie daily. In November 2015 he was back at the Ministry of Foreign Affairs, on a post of a spokesman. From 9 May 2016 to 9 October 2017 he was chairman of the Polish Press Agency.

On 29 August 2018, Dmochowski was nominated ambassador to Montenegro, presenting his letter of credence on 6 September 2018.

He is married to Monika Dmochowska, with two children.

Honours 

 The Commander's Cross of the Order of Polonia Restituta (2017)
 Cross of Freedom and Solidarity (2016)

Books 

 Zginął za Polskę bez komunistów. Zarys biografii Józefa Kurasia „Ognia”, Warszawa: Wydawnictwo CDN, 1987.
 Wietnam. Wojna bez zwycięzców, Kraków: Europa, 1991, 2000.
 Wietnam 1962–1975, Warszawa: Dom Wydawniczy Bellona, 2003.
 Kulisy kryzysu: o przyszłości Polski i Europy, Lublin; Warszawa: Wydawnictwo Słowa i Myśli, 2013.
 Między Unią a Rosją: o polskiej racji stanu, polityce zagranicznej i miejscu Polski w Unii Europejskiej, Lublin; Warszawa" Wydawnictwo Słowa i Myśli, 2013.
 Kościół "Wyborczej": największa operacja resortowych dzieci, Lublin: Wydawnictwo Słowa i Myśli, 2014.
 Najdłuższa wojna: przed Ukrainą był Wietnam, Lublin; Warszawa: Wydawnictwo Słowa i Myśli, 2014.
 Jak wygrać wybory, Lublin; Warszawa: Wydawnictwo Słowa i Myśli, 2014.

References 

1959 births
Ambassadors of Poland to Montenegro
Commanders of the Order of Polonia Restituta
Jagiellonian University alumni
Living people
Journalists from Kraków
Polish columnists
Polish essayists
Male essayists
Polish television journalists
Political spokespersons
Recipients of Cross of Freedom and Solidarity
Diplomats from Kraków
Polish male non-fiction writers
Fulbright alumni